Balat may refer to:

Places
 Balat, Fatih, a neighborhood in the historic part of Istanbul, Turkey
 Balat, Didim, Turkey
 Balat, Bihar, India
 Balat, Meghalaya, India
 Balat, a settlement and archaeological site in Dakhla Oasis, Egypt
 Ba Lạt, a seaport in Vietnam at the Red River (Asia)

People
 See Balat (surname)

Other 
 BALaT, an image database maintained by the Royal Institute for Cultural Heritage in Belgium

See also
 Ba'alat Gebal, the goddess of the city of Byblos, Phoenicia in ancient times